Kasarani Constituency is an electoral constituency in Nairobi. It is one of seventeen constituencies of Nairobi City County. It borders Ruaraka, Embakasi Central, Embakasi North, Embakasi East, Roysambu constituencies to the west; Ruiru constituency to the north; Matungulu constituency to the east and Mavoko constituency to the south-east.

Kasarani Constituency forms part of two sub-counties; Kasarani Sub-county and Njiru Sub-county.

History
The constituency was known as Nairobi Northeast Constituency at the 1963 and 1969 elections and as Mathare Constituency from 1974 elections to 1994 by-elections. Up until the 2007 elections it has been known as Kasarani Constituency. 
Prior to the 2013 general election, Kasarani was divided into four constituencies: Kasarani, Roysambu Constituency, Ruaraka Constituency, and part of Embakasi North Constituency. Regions such as Kamulu, Njiru and Ruai, were hived off from the now defunct Embakasi Constituency and combined to the remaining part of Kasarani Constituency.

Members of Parliament

Wards

Kasarani Constituency
 
Shares the same boundaries with what was known as Kasarani Division. Areas such as Njiru, Ruai and Kamulu are in Kasarani constituency. The whole of Roysambu, Ruaraka, and part of Embakasi North constituencies are within the sub-county. The Sub-county is headed by the sub-county administrator, appointed by a County Public Service Board.

References

External links 
Kasarani Constituency
Map of the constituency
Social audit of the constituency

Constituencies in Nairobi
1963 establishments in Kenya